A presidential election was held in Ethiopia on October 9, 2007, in which the Ethiopian Parliament re-elected Girma Woldegiorgis for a second six-year term. He was first elected by the upper house, the House of Federation, before being elected by the lower house, the House of People's Representatives, with 430 votes in favor, 88 against, and 11 abstaining.

References

2007
Presidential election
2007 elections in Africa